Puranpur railway station is one of the suburban railway stations in Puranpur City, Pilibhit district, Uttar Pradesh. Its code is PP. It serves Puranpur town. The station consists of 3 Platforms.

References

Railway stations in Pilibhit district